Corymbia umbonata, commonly known as the rusty bloodwood, is a species of tree that is endemic to the Top End of the Northern Territory. It has thin, rough bark on the trunk, often also the branches, lance-shaped or curved adult leaves, flower buds in groups of seven, creamy white flowers and urn-shaped fruit.

Description
It has thin, rough, tessellated bark on the trunk, often also on the branches, smooth creamy pink to pale grey bark above. Flowering has been observed in March and April and the flowers are creamy white.

Taxonomy and naming
The rusty bloodwood was first formally described in 1985 by Denis John Carr and Stella Grace Maisie Carr who gave it the name Eucalyptus umbonata and published the description in their book, Eucalyptus 1 - New or little-known species of the Corymbosae. The type specimens were collected by Laurence Adams near Katherine in 1964. In 1995, Ken Hill and Lawrie Johnson changed the name to Corymbia umbonata, publishing the change in the journal Telopea.

Distribution and habitat
Corymbia umbonata grows in open forest and savannah woodland in the Top End of the Northern Territory, including in the Judbarra / Gregory, Kakadu and Nitmiluk National Parks.

See also
List of Corymbia species

References

umbonata
Myrtales of Australia
Flora of the Northern Territory
Plants described in 1985
Taxa named by Maisie Carr